The Nansha Port Expressway is a truck transportation route in Guangzhou connecting Nansha District to other areas within the Pearl River Delta region. It is 72 km in length and cost ¥6.509 billion RMB.

Geography 
The Nansha Port Expressway starts from Longxue Island to Guangzhou Nansha District. The expressway is also in the vicinity of major roads such as Humen highways to Dongguan, Beijing-Zhuhai East Line and other expressways.

Economy 
The expressway is a critical transport route which serves Port of Guangzhou's Nansha port, Nansha development zone and the metropolitan industrial areas of Guangzhou and to Dongguan.

Exit list 
The entire route is in Guangzhou.

References 

Transport in Guangzhou